The Sony Ericsson Vivaz (U5i) is a smartphone, announced by Sony Ericsson on 21 January 2010. It was released on 5 March 2010 in the color schemes Moon Silver, Cosmic Black, Galaxy Blue and Venus Ruby. 

The phone is compact and has its focus spread to multiple functions, photography, HD video recording, music playback and internet connectivity. The camera is located on the back, together with the LED flashlight. It is not covered by any special slider. The side of the phone features four buttons on one side: one for activating the camera functionality and starting/stopping video recording, one for taking pictures once the camera is enabled, and the remaining two in the form of a rocker for volume control / camera zoom depending on the active mode. The other side has a covered Micro-B USB slot for charging and connecting to a computer.

The front of the phone is dominated by the  resistive touchscreen, with a 360x640 resolution. Below the touchscreen are three buttons, green (left), white (center) and red (right).

Software-wise, the Vivaz uses the Symbian operating system (S60 series 5th Edition). It also uses the PlayNow service, Sony Ericsson's mobile content platform. In addition to the usual GPRS/UMTS/EDGE connectivity, the Vivaz also has Wi-Fi (b and g standards) and Bluetooth.

Since June 2010 the Sony Ericsson Vivaz Pro (U8i) is also available which is a similar phone to Vivaz, but sports a slide-out QWERTY keyboard and a 5-megapixel camera.

The Vivaz and the Sony Ericsson Satio are the last Sony Ericsson phones to run Symbian. After that, all Sony Ericsson smartphones run Android under the Xperia brand.

Features 
 16:9, 3.2 inch widescreen
 8-megapixel camera U8 Vivaz 5.1-megapixel in U8i Vivaz Pro version.
 U8i Vivaz Pro build in - Fully Function QWERTY keyboard, - 
 Accelerometer sensor for UI auto-rotate, Scratch-resistant surface, Turn-to-mute and snoozing alarms.
 Handwriting recognition
 Symbian S60 5th Edition Operating System
 Touch navigation

Dimensions
 Dimensions 107 x 52 x 12.5 mm 
 Weight 97 gm

Display
 HD TFT resistive touchscreen
 16 million colors
 360x 640 pixels
 3.2 inches

CPU
 Texas Instruments OMAP3630 Cortex-A8 @ 720 MHz
 3D Accelerator PowerVR SGX530 graphics

Memory
 RAM: 256 MB
 Storage: 75 MB
 Memory card support: up to 32 GB microSD (8 GB card included)

Connectivity
 aGPS: First time location detection might take longer than usual
 Bluetooth technology
 Modem
 PC Synchronization
 USB support
 USB mass storage
 Wi-Fi 802.11 b/g, DLNA
 PictBridge
 Google Maps
 TV Out(AV)

Camera
 8.1 MegaPixel HD
 Digital Zoom - up to 4x
 LED Flash 
 Video recording (640x480 @ 30 frame/s, 1280x720 @ 24 frame/s) 720p
 Geo-Tagging
 Face detection (Smiling Face Detected)
 Image stabilisation (Still Image)
 Video Player MP4/H.264/H.263 player 
 Video Call (Using rear camera)

NetWork
 Network 2G : GSM 850 / 900 / 1800 / 1900, 
 Network 3G : HSDPA 900 / 2100 HSDPA 850 / 1900 / 2100

Internet
 Web Google (Google Talks, Gmail, Google Map, GPS Maps)
 Web Yahoo (Messenger Chat latest version)
 Web MSN - Hotmail (Msn messenger Chat)
 Web browser - WebKit
 Web feeds

Location
 Google maps 3.0
 Wisepilot (30 days Trial)
 Location

Log
 Dialed (30 Days)
 Received (30 Days)
 Missed ( 30 Days)

Applications
 TrackID
 Media Server
 Neo Reader
 SMS Preview
 YouTube
 Record Sound
 Web Publish
 Facebook Application
 Twitter Application

Entertainment
 3D games
 Java
 Media
 Radio - FM radio with RDS (Radio Data System)
 YouTube
 HD Games

Messaging
 Email
 Exchange ActiveSync
 Instant messaging
 Picture messaging (MMS)
 Predictive text input
 Sound recorder
 Text messaging (SMS)
 Conversations

Communication
 Polyphonic ringtones
 Speakerphone
 Vibrating Alert
 Video calling(Main 8.1 Mega Pixel Camera)

Design
 Auto rotate
 Picture wallpaper

Organiser
 Alarm clock
 Calculator
 Calendar
 Document editors
 Document readers
 Flight mode
 Handwriting recognition
 Notes
 Phone book
 Touchscreen

Sony Ericsson Vivaz Pro
The Sony Ericsson Vivaz Pro has a few differences from the Vivaz, such as a downsized 5-megapixel camera with HD video recording, a slide-out QWERTY keyboard and a larger-size device (109 x 52 x 15 mm, 117g). Other than those differences, both devices are very similar.

See also
OMAP

References

External links

Review @ Engadget
Sony Ericsson Vivaz stress test

Mobile phones introduced in 2010
Sony Ericsson smartphones
Symbian devices